Nancy Houk is an American astronomer who led the effort to establish a comprehensive database of stellar temperatures and luminosities.

Education 
After earning her Doctorate in Astronomy from Case Western Reserve University in 1967, Nancy Houk was a postdoctoral student at Case Western and the Kapteyn Laboratory in the Netherlands.

During her undergraduate years at the University of Michigan, Houk researched at the Maria Mitchell Observatory, a memorial to Maria Mitchell, America's first woman professional astronomer.

Career 
Houk joined the Astronomy Department at the University of Michigan in 1970 as a Research Associate, followed by promotions to Research Associate in 1973, the Associate Research Scientist in 1977, then Research Scientist in 1985.

Research 
Houk led the effort to establish a comprehensive database of stellar temperatures and luminosities. Houk's photographic observations of stars were made using the University of Michigan 0.61-m Curtis Schmidt telescope located at Cerro Tololo Interamerican Observatory (CTIO). CTIO, established in 1960, is a campus of astronomical telescopes located east of La Serena, Chile at an altitude of 2200 meters. CTIO is part of the National Optical Astronomy Observatory (NOAO). The telescope that Houk used was moved from Portage Lake Observatory in Michigan to CTIO in 1966. Houk began her observations in 1971. By 2014, the project had assembled five volumes covering the sky from the south celestial pole to +5° declination, consisting of 162,900 stars in total.

The plates images are spectral images, taken with an objective prism at the front of the telescope.  The images provide information about the physical properties of stars such as their composition of atomic elements and molecules, mass, temperature, rotational properties, age, distance, spectra classification and more. Houk used this data to construct the fundamental diagram used in astrophysics called the Hertzsprung-Russell Diagram that forms the basis of modern astrophysics.

Astronomical Photographic Data Archive 
Houk retired in 2001 and donated half her plate collection which surveyed the entire southern hemisphere night sky to the Astronomical Photographic Data Archive (APDA) in 2004. The other half of her collection resides in Japan. APDA, located at the Pisgah Astronomical Research Institute, plans to digitize her photographic plates.

Publications 

Her research is published in 5 volumes of the Michigan Spectral Catalog where the first set of HR diagrams are presented from her data. The publications resulting from her research, and conferences where she presented her results are listed below:
 2007 Astronomical Journal, 134, P.1089 Sowell, J. R.; Trippe, M.; Caballero-Nieves, S. M.; Houk, N. H-R Diagrams Based on the HD Stars in the Michigan Spectral Catalogue and the Hipparcos Catalog
 2007 Astronomical Journal, Volume134, P.1072 Caballero-Nieves, S. M.; Sowell, J. R.; Houk, N. Galactic Distributions and Statistics of the HD Stars in the Michigan Spectral Catalogue
 The Kth Reunion, Proceedings of a meeting held at Case Western Reserve University, 2–3 May 1998. Edited by A.G. Davis Philip. Contributions of the Institute for Space Observations, No. 18. Schenectady, NY: L. Davis Press, 2000., p. 47. Houk, Nancy; Sowell, James; Swift, C. M. The Michigan Spectral Survey of the HD Stars
 1999 Michigan Spectral Survey, Ann Arbor, Dep. Astron., Univ. Michigan, Vol. 5. Houk, N.; Swift, C., Michigan catalogue of two-dimensional spectral types for the HD Stars, Vol. 5
 1999 "Michigan catalogue of two-dimensional spectral types for the HD Stars ; vol. 5. By Nancy Houk and Carrie Swift. Ann Arbor, Michigan : Department of Astronomy, University of Michigan, 1999. ("This is the fifth of a projected seven volumes in a program of systematic reclassification of the Henry Draper stars on the MK system..." (preface).)." Houk, Nancy; Swift, Carrie, Michigan catalogue of two-dimensional spectral types for the HD Stars ; vol. 5
 1997 Proceedings of the ESA Symposium `Hipparcos - Venice '97', 13–16 May, Venice, Italy, ESA SP-402 (July 1997), p. 485-488. Murray, C. A.; Penston, M. J.; Binney, J. J.; Houk, N., The Luminosity Function of Main Sequence Stars within 80 parsecs
 1997 Proceedings of the ESA Symposium `Hipparcos - Venice '97', 13–16 May, Venice, Italy, ESA SP-402 (July 1997), p. 473-478. Binney, J. J.; Dehnen, W.; Houk, N.; Murray, C. A.; Penston, M. J., The Kinematics of Main Sequence Stars from HIPPARCOS Data
 1997 Proceedings of the ESA Symposium `Hipparcos - Venice '97', 13-16 May, Venice, Italy, ESA SP-402 (July 1997), p. 279-282. Houk, N.; Swift, C. M.; Murray, C. A.; Penston, M. J.; Binney, J. J.. The Properties of Main-Sequence Stars from HIPPARCOS Data
 1995 The future utilisation of Schmidt telescopes. Astronomical Society of the Pacific Conference Series, Volume 84; Proceedings of IAU Colloquium 148 held 7-11 March 1994 in Bandung; Indonesia; San Francisco: Astronomical Society of the Pacific (ASP); |c1995; edited by Jessica Chapman, Russell Cannon, Sandra Harrison, and Bambang Hidayat, p.315. Houk, N.; Sowell, J.; Austin, S., Aitoff Projection Plots and Other Statistical Results for Stars in Volumes 1-4 of the Michigan Catalogue of MK Types for the HD Stars
 1995 The future utilisation of Schmidt telescopes. Astronomical Society of the Pacific Conference Series, Volume 84; Proceedings of IAU Colloquium 148 held 7-11 March 1994 in Bandung; Indonesia; San Francisco: Astronomical Society of the Pacific (ASP); |c1995; edited by Jessica Chapman, Russell Cannon, Sandra Harrison, and Bambang Hidayat, p.292. Houk, N.; von Hippel, T. The Michigan 10-Degree Blue Spectral Survey as a Basis for Future Deep Schmidt Surveys
 1995 The future utilisation of Schmidt telescopes. Astronomical Society of the Pacific Conference Series, Volume 84; Proceedings of IAU Colloquium 148 held 7-11 March 1994 in Bandung; Indonesia; San Francisco: Astronomical Society of the Pacific (ASP); |c1995; edited by Jessica Chapman, Russell Cannon, Sandra Harrison, and Bambang Hidayat, p.53. Seitzer, P.; Houk, N., CCDs on the Curtis Schmidt Telescope
 1994 The MK process at 50 years. A powerful tool for astrophysical insight Astronomical Society of the Pacific Conference Series, Proceedings of a Workshop of the Vatican Observatory, held in Tucson Arizona, USA, September 1993, San Francisco: Astronomical Society of the Pacific (ASP), |c1994, edited by Chris Corbally, R. O. Gray, and R. F. Garrison, p.365. Austin, S. K.; Houk, N.; Sowell, J. R., Aitoff Projection Plots for Stars in Volumes 1-4 of the Michigan Spectral Catalogue
 1994 The MK process at 50 years. A powerful tool for astrophysical insight Astronomical Society of the Pacific Conference Series, Proceedings of a Workshop of the Vatican Observatory, held in Tucson Arizona, USA, September 1993, San Francisco: Astronomical Society of the Pacific (ASP), |c1994, edited by Chris Corbally, R. O. Gray, and R. F. Garrison, p.285. Houk, N., The Michigan Survey and the Continuing Importance of Spectral Surveys
 1991 Objective-Prism and Other Surveys : a meeting in memory of Nicholas Sanduleak, May 9–11, 1991, Van Vleck Observatory, Middletown, Conn. Edited by A.G.D. Philip, and Arthur R. Upgren. Schenectady, N.Y.: L. Davis Press, 1991., p. 27. Houk, Nancy, The Space Distribution of Supergiants and Other Stars in the Michigan Spectral Catalogue, Volumes 1 - 4
 1988 Michigan Catalogue of Two-dimensional Spectral Types for the HD Stars. Volume 4, Declinations -26°.0 to -12°.0.. N. Houk, M. Smith-Moore.Department of Astronomy, University of Michigan, Ann Arbor, MI 48109–1090, USA. 14+505 pp. Price US 25.00 (USA, Canada), US 28.00 (Foreign) (1988). Houk, N.; Smith-Moore, M., Michigan Catalogue of Two-dimensional Spectral Types for the HD Stars. Volume 4, Declinations -26°.0 to -12°.0.
 1986 Spectroscopic and Photometric Classification of Population II Stars, A. G. Davis Philip and Arthur R. Upgren, eds., p. 19. Houk, Nancy, Weak-Lined HD Stars in the Michigan Spectral Catalogues
 1984 Book, Ann Arbor: University of Michigan, 1984, Houk, Nancy; Newberry, Michael V., A second atlas of objective-prism spectra
 1984 Ann Arbor: University of Michigan, 1984. Houk, N., 100,000 MK Types: A Mid-Course Look at the HD Reclassification Project
 1983 The Nearby Stars and the Stellar Luminosity Function, Proceedings of IAU Colloquium No. 76 held 13–16 June 1983 at Wesleyan University, Middletown, Connecticut. Edited by A.G.D. Philip and A.R. Upgren. Schenectady, NY: L. Davis Press, p. 345, 1983. Houk, N., Data for Nearby Stars from the Michigan Spectral Catalogues
 1982 Michigan Catalogue of Two-dimensional Spectral Types for the HD stars. Volume_3. Declinations -40 Degrees to -26 Degrees., by Houk, N.. Ann Arbor, MI(USA): Department of Astronomy, University of Michigan, 12 + 390 p. Houk, N., Michigan Catalogue of Two-dimensional Spectral Types for the HD stars. Volume_3. Declinations -40 Degrees to -26 Degrees.
 1979 International Astronomical Union, Colloquium on Spectral Classification of the Future, Vatican City, July 11–15, 1978. Ricerche Astronomiche (IAU Colloquium 47), vol. 9, 1979, p. 51-56; Discussion, p. 56-58. NSF-supported research. Houk, N., Future objective-prism spectral classification at MK dispersion
 1978 In: The HR diagram - The 100th anniversary of Henry Norris Russell; Proceedings of the Symposium, Washington, D.C., November 2-5, 1977. (A79-14326 03-89) Dordrecht, D. Reidel Publishing Co., 1978, p. 91-97; Discussion, p. 98. NSF-supported research. Houk, N.; Fesen, R., HR diagrams derived from the Michigan Spectral Catalogue
 1977 Bull. Inf. Cent. Données Stellaires, No. 13, p. 54 - 58. Barbier, M.; Bidelman, W. P.; Dluzhnevskaya, O.; Hauck, B.; Houk, N.; Jaschek, C.; McCarthy, M.; Mead, J.; Nandy, K.; Philip, D., IAU Commission 45: Working Group on Spectroscopic and Photometric Data. Catalogs recently published, to be published or in preparation. List VII.
 1977 Publications of the Astronomical Society of the Pacific, Vol. 89, p. 347 - 348. Irvine, N. J.; Houk, N., Spectral changes in the pre-main-sequence star HD 97048.
 1976 Publications of the Astronomical Society of the Pacific, Vol. 88, p. 37 - 40 = Dominion Astrophys. Obs., Contrib. No. 257 = NRC No. 14911. Cowley, A. P.; Houk, N., The rapidly varying emission spectrum of HD 158503.
 1976 Astronomical Journal, Volume.81, p. 116, Houk, N.; Hartoog, M. R.; Cowley, A. P., On stars and supergiants south of declination -53.0
 1976 Abundance Effects in Classification, Proceedings from IAU Symposium no. 72 held in Lausanne-Dorigny, Switzerland, July 8–11, 1975. Edited by B. Hauck, Philip Child Keenan, and William Wilson Morgan. International Astronomical Union. Symposium no. 72, Dordrecht, Holland; Boston: D. Reidel Pub. Co., p. 127. Houk, N.; Hartoog, M. R., HD Stars South of Declination = -53 Degrees Having Peculiar Abundances: Statistics and Notation
 1975 Publications of the Astronomical Society of the Pacific, Vol. 87, p. 527 - 528. Cowley, A. P.; Houk, N., An interesting new southern peculiar A star - HD 137509.
 1975 University of Michigan Catalogue of two-dimensional spectral types for the HD stars. Volume I. Declinations -90 to -53 Degrees., by Houk, N.; Cowley, A. P.. Ann Arbor, MI (USA): Department of Astronomy, University of Michigan, 19 + 452 p. Houk, N.; Cowley, A. P., University of Michigan Catalogue of two-dimensional spectral types for the HD stars. Volume I. Declinations -90 to -53 Degrees.
 1974 Outline of astronomy. Vols. 1 and 2., by Voigt, H. H.; Plaut, L.; Houk, N.. Translated from the German edition. Groningen (Netherlands): Noordhoff International Publishing, Academic Book Services, 556 p. Voigt, H. H.; Plaut, L.; Houk, N., Outline of astronomy. Vols. 1 and 2.
 1973 Spectral Classification and Multicolour Photometry. IAU Symposium no. 50 held in Villa Carlos Paz, Argentina, October 18–24, 1971. Edited by Charles Fehrenbach and Bengt E. Westerlund. International Astronomical Union. Symposium no. 50, Dordrecht, Boston, Reidel, p. 70. Houk, N.; Cowley, A., Two-Dimensional Classification of the HD Stars
 1971, Astronomical Journal, Volume 76, p.1117, McCuskey, W. W.; Houk, Nancy, Distribution of B8-A3 Stars near the Galactic Plane. 1. Galactic Longitudes 50' to 150'
 1970 Astrophysical Journal, Volume 159, p.963. Fitzgerald, M. P.; Houk, Nancy, Spectral Observations, 1965-1968, of the Peculiar Emission Object V1016 Cygni (MH?328-116)
 1968, AJS, Volume 73, p.18, Houk, Nancy, Spectral Variations of 121 Faint Long-Period Variable Stars.

References

External links

Year of birth missing (living people)
Living people
American women astronomers
Case Western Reserve University alumni
University of Michigan College of Literature, Science, and the Arts alumni